Brayan Angulo may refer to:

 Brayan Angulo (footballer, born 1989), Colombian football left-back
 Brayan Angulo (footballer, born 1993), Colombian football midfielder

See also
 Bryan Angulo (born 1995), Ecuadorian football forward